Carnarechinus clypeatus is a species of sea urchins of the Holasteroida order.

This species was described on the basis of fragmentary and poorly preserved material from Philippines, hence its taxonomic status is still unclear. Molecular phylogeny indicates it may be a basal member of the Urechinina.

References
 Carnarechinus at the Natural History Museum
 

Holasteroida
Monotypic echinoderm genera
Echinoidea genera